Dovid Tzvi Schustal (born July 1947) is an Orthodox rabbi and one of the four roshei yeshiva (deans) of Beth Medrash Govoha (the Lakewood Yeshiva) in Lakewood, New Jersey. He shares this post with Rabbi Malkiel Kotler, Rabbi Yerucham Olshin, and Rabbi Yisroel Neuman.

Biography
Schustal is the eldest child of Rabbi Eliyahu Simcha Schustal (1923–2012) and his wife, Sarah (1925–2015), the daughter of Rabbi Shmuel Ehrenfeld, the Mattersdorfer Rav. He was born a year after his parents' marriage and their move to Monsey, New York, where Rav Simcha Schustal served as rosh kollel of the kollel attached to Beth Medrash Elyon for nearly 30 years. He has two younger brothers and four sisters.

Schustal married the daughter of the previous rosh yeshiva of Beth Medrash Govoha, Rabbi Shneur Kotler, who was the son of the founding rosh yeshiva, Rabbi Aharon Kotler.

References

External links
The Gedolim Speak: Rav Dovid Schustal, shlit"a

Beth Medrash Govoha
American Haredi rabbis
Rosh yeshivas
People from Lakewood Township, New Jersey
Living people
1947 births
Rabbis from New Jersey